Theresa Uzoamaka Uzokwe  is a Nigerian legal practitioner. She is the current Chief Judge of Abia State after she was appointed on 22 December 2014 by Theodore Orji. Prior to her appointment, she had served twice in the position as acting Chief Judge.

See also
Chief Judge of Abia State

References

Living people
Anambra State lawyers
Chief Judges of Abia State
Year of birth missing (living people)